The 1994 season is the 41st year in Guangzhou Football Club's existence, their 27th season in the Chinese football league and the first season in the professional football league.

Technical staff

Squad

Transfers

Winter

 In

 Out

Summer

 In

 Out

Match results

Friendly matches

Jia-A League

League table

References

1994
Guangzhou Apollo